Chao is a title of the Lan Na royal family members.

Chao Har Kan    
Chao Har Kan (เจ้าห้าขัน, lit: 'Five lords') is the style for high ranking royalty in each Lan Na state.

After the fall of the absolute monarchy, the Chao har kan system was abolished by the People's Party (Khana Ratsadon - คณะราษฎร). 
Today, all of the Chao family use  na Chiangmai, na Lamphun, and na Lampang as their surname.

 Chao Luang (เจ้าหลวง)  - The ruler of state. The ruler of Chiang Mai is the highest post in the five Lan Na states. 
 Chao Uparaja (เจ้าอุปราช) - The viceroy of state.  
 Chao Rajawong (เจ้าราชวงศ์) - Son of Chao Luang.
 Chao Burirat (เจ้าบุรีรัตน์) - Son of Chao Luang.
 Chao Rajabute (เจ้าราชบุตร) - Son of Chao Luang.

Lan Na